is a Japanese manga series by Tetsuya Imai. It was serialized in Kodansha's seinen manga magazine Monthly Afternoon from January to October 2011, with its chapters collected in two tankōbon volumes. An anime film adaptation by Zero-G premiered in Japan in October 2022.

Characters

Media

Manga
Kodansha collected its chapters in two tankōbon volumes, released respectively on June 23 and November 22, 2011.

In July 2022, Kodansha USA announced that they licensed the series for an English print release.

Anime film
In March 2022, it was announced that an anime film adaptation was in production. The film was produced by Zero-G and directed by Tomoyuki Kurokawa, with Dai Satō writing the scripts, Pomodorosa designing the characters, and Masaru Yokoyama composing the music. It premiered in Japan on October 21, 2022. The film's theme song, "Itsushika" (Before You Know It), is performed by Daichi Miura.

See also
Alice & Zoroku, another manga series by the same author

References

External links
  
  
 

2022 anime films
Anime films based on manga
Kodansha manga
Manga adapted into films
Science fiction anime and manga
Seinen manga
Zero-G (studio)